The 5th General Assembly of Citizens was held between 30 April and 3 May 2020 to renovate the leading bodies of the Citizens party (Cs) and establish the party's main lines of action and strategy for the next leadership term. A primary election to elect the new party president was held between 7 and 8 March. The assembly was called following the resignation of party leader Albert Rivera on 11 November 2019 as a result of Cs obtaining the worst electoral result of the party in the general election held on 10 November.

The assembly was originally planned to be held on 14 and 15 March, but was delayed and forced to be held telematically as a result of the outbreak of the COVID-19 pandemic earlier that month and the enforcement of nationwide lockdowns to reduce the spread of SARS-CoV-2.

The leadership election saw the spokesperson of the party's parliamentary group in the Congress of Deputies, Inés Arrimadas, becoming the new party president, winning the membership vote by almost 77% of the vote over Vice President of Castile and León Francisco Igea, who got 22.3% of the share. A Valencian member with no official post, Ximo Aparici, contested the primary getting 0.8% of the votes.

Candidates

Declined
The individuals in this section were the subject of speculation about their possible candidacy, but publicly denied or recanted interest in running:
Ignacio Aguado (age ) — Vice President of the Community of Madrid (since 2019); Minister of Sports and Transparency of the Community of Madrid (since 2019); Government Spokesperson of the Community of Madrid (since 2019); Deputy in the Assembly of Madrid (since 2015)
Luis Garicano (age ) — Member of the European Parliament (for Spain) (since 2019) 
Albert Rivera (age ) — Member of the Congress of Deputies (2015–2019); President of the Citizens Party (2006–2019); Member of the Catalan Parliament (2006–2015)
Begoña Villacís (age ) — Deputy Mayor of Madrid (since 2019); City Councillor of Madrid (since 2015)

Endorsements

Inés Arrimadas

Results

References

Other

Political party leadership elections in Spain
Citizens (Spanish political party) leadership election